Guidarino Guidi (1922–2003) was an Italian film actor and director. Most of Guidi's film work took place in the 1960s and early 70s with nine acting credits to his name in addition to several Assistant Director and Casting Director billets. His single directorial role is credited as a segment of the 1961 film Cronache del '22.

Guidi's limited appearance in American cinema took place in 1973 when he played the Fascist Interior Minister Guido Buffarini Guidi (coincidentally having the same family name as his character) in the film Massacre in Rome. He thereafter retired from film work, and died in 2003.

Filmography

External links

Italian male actors
Italian film directors
1929 births
2003 deaths